The Roseau County Courthouse is a historic building located at 216 West Center Street in Roseau, Minnesota, United States; the seat of Roseau County. It was designed by architects Anton Werner Lignell and Robert Loebeck and constructed in 1913.

References

Buildings and structures in Roseau County, Minnesota
County courthouses in Minnesota
County government buildings in Minnesota
Courthouses on the National Register of Historic Places in Minnesota
Defunct prisons in Minnesota
Government buildings completed in 1913
National Register of Historic Places in Roseau County, Minnesota
1913 establishments in Minnesota
Anton Werner Lignell buildings